Christine Rosati Randall (born June 22, 1969) is an American politician who served in the Connecticut House of Representatives from the 44th district from 2015 to 2017.

References

1969 births
Living people
Democratic Party members of the Connecticut House of Representatives